Loaeza is a surname. Notable people with the surname include:

Guadalupe Loaeza (born 1946), Mexican writer and journalist
Soledad Loaeza (born 1950), Mexican academic and writer

See also
Loaiza